Brian Walker (born May 31, 1972) is a former American football safety in the National Football League (NFL) for the Washington Redskins, Miami Dolphins, Seattle Seahawks, and the Detroit Lions.  He played college football for Washington State University.

External links
 

1972 births
Living people
American football safeties
Washington State Cougars football players
Washington Redskins players
Miami Dolphins players
Seattle Seahawks players
Detroit Lions players
Players of American football from Colorado Springs, Colorado